International Convention Centre or International Convention Center may refer to:

Africa
 Kenyatta International Convention Centre, Kenya
 Cape Town International Convention Centre, South Africa
 Durban International Convention Centre, South Africa

Asia
 International Convention Center (Jerusalem)
 International Convention Center Jeju, South Korea
 Dubai International Convention Centre, UAE
 Suntec Singapore International Convention and Exhibition Centre
 Taipei International Convention Center, Taiwan
 Cebu International Convention Center, Philippines
 Philippine International Convention Center, Philippines
 International Convention Centre, Pune, India
 Hyderabad International Convention Centre, India
 Rajgir International Convention Centre, Rajgir, India
 India International Convention & Expo Centre – IICC, Delhi, India
 King Salman International Convention Center, Medina, Kingdom of Saudi Arabia

Europe
 International Convention Centre, Birmingham, England
 International Convention Centre Wales, Newport, Wales
 Ukrainian House, officially known as the International Convention Center, in Kyiv, Ukraine

North America
 Georgia International Convention Center, US
 Kentucky International Convention Center, US

Oceania
 International Convention Centre Sydney, Australia